The Église Notre-Dame de la Visitation de Rochefort (Church of the Visitation of the Holy Virgin, or Church of Our Lady of the Visitation), is a religious building in the Belgian city of Rochefort and the seat of a deanery.

History 
The first church edifice dates back to 1041, therefore the oldest building in the municipality of Behogne-Rochefort. The church burned during the offensive of the army of the Count of Duras in 1653, it was rebuilt and restored 1782. The current building was designed by Brussels architect Jean-Pierre Cluysenaar, the church was put into service on May 24, 1874 and inaugurated on November 11 of the same year by Théodore-Joseph Gravez, Bishop of Namur.

Architecture 
The church is built in the neo-Romanesque style with local limestone. The central facade, flanked by two towers, is decorated with a rosette and bears eight statues at its center.

Gallery

References 

Churches in Belgium